Pain is a surname. The Oxford Dictionary of Family Names in Britain and Ireland records it as a variant of Payne, along with Paine, Payn, Pane, Payen, Payan, Panes, and Pagan. The name Payne is believed to derive from the medieval English personal name Pagan. The Dictionary of American Family Names describes Pain as a variant of the name Paine.

Pain is also an alternative spelling of the Indian surname Pyne.

Notable people with the surname include (birth date order):
Elizabeth Pain (c. 1652 – 26 November 1704), settler in Boston, Massachusetts
James Pain (1779–1877), English architect
Arthur Pain (1841-1920), bishop in Australia
William Plain (1855-1924), British army officer
Barry Pain (1864-1928), English journalist, poet and writer
Edwin Pain (1891-1947), English cricketer
Nesta Pain (1905-1995), British broadcaster and writer
Peter Pain (1913-2003), British judge
Rollo Pain (1921-2005), British army officer
Edward Pain (1925-2000), Australian rower
Jean Pain (1928-1981), Swiss inventor
Denis Pain (1936-2019), New Zealand judge and sports administrator
Quentin Pain (born 1956), British writer on accounting and entrepreneur
Richard Pain (born 1956), bishop in Wales
Bedabrata Pain (born 1963), Indian scientist and film director
Debbie Pain (active 1988-), British conservation biologist
Jeff Pain (born 1970), Canadian skeleton racer
François Pain (active 1990s), French film-maker
Erwan Pain (born 1986), French ice hockey player
Mélanie Pain (active 2004-), French singer
Connor Pain (born 1993), Australian soccer player

See also
Paine (surname)
Pyne (surname)

References

Surnames